Pendem may refer to:
Benteng Pendem (disambiguation)
Benteng Pendem (Cilacap)
Dorababu Pendem, Indian politician